Leptophobia pinara, the Pinara white, is a butterfly in the family Pieridae. It is found in Peru, Ecuador and Colombia.

References

Pierini
Butterflies described in 1865
Pieridae of South America
Taxa named by Baron Cajetan von Felder
Taxa named by Rudolf Felder

nl:Leptophobia philoma